Three Creeks is an unincorporated community in northern Alberta, Canada.

The name of the community is a reference to the three creeks that flow west through the community into the Peace River, among them being Wesley Creek and Carmon Creek.

The Three Creeks Provincial Grazing Reserve provides hunting grounds for moose and deer.

Administration 
The community is located in census division No. 17. It is administered by Northern Sunrise County and is represented by the Ward 5-Three Creeks councillor.

Geography 
It has an elevation of 540 m (1772 ft).

See also 
List of communities in Alberta

References 

Localities in Northern Sunrise County